Augustus Gilbert Finnis Clark (31 July 1862 – 7 May 1928) was an English cricketer.  Clark was a left-handed batsman who bowled left-arm medium pace.  He was born at Dover, Kent.

Clark made a single first-class appearance for Sussex against the Marylebone Cricket Club at Lord's in 1886. Clark batted at number ten in Sussex's first-innings and was dismissed for a single run by Jimmy Wootton.  In their second-innings he batted at number four and was dismissed by the same bowler for a duck, with Sussex winning the match by 59 runs.  This was his only major appearance for Sussex.

He died at Hastings, Sussex on 7 May 1928.

References

External links
Augustus Clark at ESPNcricinfo
Augustus Clark at CricketArchive

1862 births
1928 deaths
Sportspeople from Dover, Kent
English cricketers
Sussex cricketers